The Mark Clark Bridge was a girder bridge that carried a State Route 532 across the Stillaguamish River between Stanwood, Washington, and Camano Island. It was the only form of road access to Camano Island from 1950 until 2010, when it was demolished. The bridge was named for Mark W. Clark, a decorated Army officer who spent time on Camano Island. The water surrounding Camano Island is too shallow for ferry service, which made this bridge a critical link for island residents and visitors.

The bridge replaced an earlier swing bridge that opened in 1909 and was part of the first highway between Stanwood and Camano Island. Shortly after the highway was incorporated into the state highway system in 1945, a $615,000 replacement was planned by the state government at the request of Stanwood, Camano Island, and the former town of East Stanwood. It was dedicated on July 23, 1950, and was connected to a new highway bypassing Stanwood and East Stanwood.

Replacement

The Washington State Department of Transportation (WSDOT) began construction of a new Stillaguamish River bridge in the summer of 2009. The Mark Clark Bridge was found to be too narrow and vulnerable in the event of a major earthquake.

On August 17, 2010, the new Camano Gateway Bridge opened to traffic.  As a result, the Mark Clark bridge was closed to traffic and later demolished.

References

Buildings and structures demolished in 2010
Demolished bridges in the United States
Transportation buildings and structures in Snohomish County, Washington
Road bridges in Washington (state)